George Woodrow "Buster" Maddox (November 4, 1911 – March 14, 1956) was an American football tackle for the Green Bay Packers of the National Football League (NFL). He played college football for Kansas State.

Biography
Maddox was born on November 4, 1911, in Greenville, Texas. He was given the nickname "Buster".

He died on March 14, 1956, at Lubbock, Texas, after having been ill for some time. He was buried on March 16, 1956, at Greenville, Texas.

Career
Maddox played with the Green Bay Packers during the 1935 NFL season. He played at the collegiate level at Kansas State University.

See also
List of Green Bay Packers players

References

1911 births
1956 deaths
American football tackles
People from Greenville, Texas
Green Bay Packers players
Kansas State University alumni
Kansas State Wildcats football players